The 2004–05 FA Women's Cup was the 35th edition of the FA Women's Cup, a knockout cup competition for women's football teams in England. It was sponsored by Nationwide, and known as The FA Women's Cup in partnership with Nationwide for sponsorship purposes. 210 clubs were accepted into the tournament.

National Division side Arsenal were the defending champions, but they were eliminated by Everton in the semi-finals. Charlton Athletic won their first FA Women's Cup title after a 1–0 win over Everton in the final.

Teams

Prize money

Qualifying rounds

First round qualifying
The matches were played on Sunday 5 September 2004, the only exception being Luton Town Belles v Brentford, which took place on Monday 6 September 2004.

Second round qualifying
All matches were played on Sunday 26 September 2004.

First round proper
The draw took place on Monday 27 September 2004. The matches were scheduled to be played on Sunday 24 October 2004. Fourteen matches (Bath City v Swindon Town, Bolton Wanderers v Doncaster Parklands Rovers, Buxton v Ilkeston Town, Cardiff City Bluebirds v AFC Bournemouth, CEFI v Reading, Crewe Alexandra v Scunthorpe United, Garswood Saints v Bradford City, Lewes v Brentford, Plymouth Argyle v Ashdown Rovers, Preston North End v Bury, Redhill v Chesham United, Shrewsbury Town v Leicester City Ladies, Wembley v Thatcham Town and Wigan Athletic v Blackpool Wren Rovers) were postponed and rescheduled for the following Sunday (31 October 2004). One match (Newton Abbot v Forest Green Rovers) was played on Monday 8 November 2004.

Second round proper
The matches were played on Sunday 14 November 2004, the only exception being Norwich City v Colchester United, which took place on Sunday 21 November 2004.

Third round proper
The draw was held on Monday 15 November 2004. All matches were played on Sunday 5 December 2004.

Watford won 5–2 against Cardiff City. However, Watford played an ineligible player and the match was awarded to Cardiff City.

Fourth round proper
The draw was held on Monday 6 December 2004. All matches were played on Sunday 9 January 2005.

Fifth round proper
The draw was held on Monday 10 January 2005. All matches were played on Sunday 30 February 2005.

Quarter-finals
The draw was held on Monday 31 January 2005. The matches were played on Sunday 13 February 2005, the only exception being Birmingham City v Arsenal, which took place on Sunday 20 February 2005.

Semi-finals
All matches were played on Sunday 20 March 2005.

Final

References

External links
 RSSSF

Women's FA Cup seasons
Cup